Clinton Derricks-Carroll (born May 15, 1953 in Knoxville, Tennessee) is an American actor and musician who is best known for Introducing Dorothy Dandridge (1999), Wally Brown (1979) and Sanford (1980-1981).

Early life

Derricks was born in Knoxville, Tennessee to a pianist mother and Baptist preacher/composer Cleavant Derricks, Sr, famous for his popular gospel music hymn Just a Little Talk with Jesus. His twin brother is Cleavant Derricks, who is also an actor.

Career

Clinton starred in the TV series Wally Brown (1979, as Wally Brown) and Sanford (1980–1981, as Cliff Anderson). He also had guest appearances in a number of other series, notably Hill Street Blues and Sliders and he wrote the music for the 1979 TV movie When Hell Freezes Over, I'll Skate.

On Sliders he played the "double" of his brother's character on three occasions ("The King Is Back", "Greatfellas" and "The Prince of Slides"). This was used instead of split screen.

In 1986 Derricks-Carroll appeared on the London stage in the role of Captain Ebony in the musical Time.

He authored the book Buy Golly!: The History of the Golliwog in 2005, published by New Cavendish Books.

Personal Fact
He got his hyphenated name from Vinnette Justine Carroll. He studied acting in her workshop for years. She said he was like a son to her and should take her name. So, he became Clinton Derricks-Carroll.

Filmography

References

External links

1953 births
Living people
American male television actors
People from Knoxville, Tennessee
African-American male actors
American twins
Identical twin male actors
Male actors from Tennessee
African-American musicians
21st-century African-American people
20th-century African-American people